Ulmus × hollandica Mill. , often known simply as Dutch elm, is a natural hybrid between Wych elm Ulmus glabra and field elm Ulmus minor which commonly occurs across Europe wherever the ranges of the parent species overlap. In England, according to the field-studies of R. H. Richens, "The largest area [of hybridization] is a band extending across Essex from the Hertfordshire border to southern Suffolk. The next largest is in northern Bedfordshire and adjoining parts of Northamptonshire. Comparable zones occur in Picardy and Cotentin in northern France". Crosses between U. × hollandica and either of the parent species are also classified as U. × hollandica. Ulmus × hollandica hybrids, natural and artificial, have been widely planted elsewhere.

The botanical name hollandica was first used for an elm variety by Plukenet in 1697 in describing a cultivar of this group now called 'Major'.

Description
In form and foliage, the trees are broadly intermediate between the two species. F1 hybrids between wych and field elm are fully fertile, but produce widely variant progeny. Many also inherit the suckering habit of their field elm parent. Both Richens and Rackham noted that examples in the East Anglian hybridization zone were sometimes pendulous in form.

Pests and diseases
Some examples of the hybrid possess a moderate resistance to Dutch elm disease.

Cultivation
The hybrid has been introduced to North America and Australasia.

Notable trees
The great elm in The Grove of Magdalen College, Oxford, photographed by Henry Taunt in 1900, long believed to be a wych elm before being identified by Elwes  as a 'Vegeta'-type hybrid, was for a time the largest elm known in Britain before it was blown down in 1911. It measured 44 m tall, its trunk at breast height being 2.6 m in diameter, and comprised an estimated  of timber, making it the largest tree of any kind in Britain and possibly the largest north of the Alps. However, as Elwes pointed out, its calculated age would place its planting in the late 17th or early 18th century, long before the introduction of the Huntingdon elm, making the tree in question more likely to be a Chichester elm. The tree survived till the 1960s. Like the Queens' College Chichester elms in Cambridge, the Magdalen College trees were not observed to produce root suckers, though The Grove at Magdalen has long been a deer park, and any sucker growth is likely to have been cropped. The Oxford zoologist Robert Gunther attributed the larger tree's unusual size to the fact (discovered in 1926) that it had been growing on a phosphate-rich bone-bed, made up of the remains of mammoths and other prehistoric animals.

Examples of mature survivors in the East Anglian hybridisation zone include those near Royston, Hertfordshire, designated 'Elm of the Year, 2004' by Das Ulmen Büro. An example of the weeping form survives at Actons Farm, Sawbridgeworth, Hertfordshire.

The so-called W. G. Grace Elm, a majestic spreading hybrid (labelled just "Dutch elm"), the last survivor (2009) of a ring of elms round East Oval, Ballarat, Victoria, was reputedly planted by W. G. Grace himself in 1874 during a tour by the England cricket team. It has been shown, however, to date from 1900. 'W. G. G.' had attained a spread round the middle of 31 m by 1982.

Cultivars
At least 40 cultivars have been recorded, although some may not have survived Dutch elm disease:

Cultivars at one time or another identified as U. × hollandica, but which may have suffered misidentification through confusion with U. glabra Huds. cultivars that share the same name:
 'Fastigiata Glabra', 'Fastigiata Macrophylla', 'Latifolia', 'Rugosa'
In the 19th century and early 20th, Ulmus × hollandica cultivars (as well as those of wych elm) were often grouped under Ulmus montana.

In art
The elms in the Suffolk landscape-paintings and drawings of John Constable were "most probably East Anglian hybrid elms ... such as still grow in the same hedges" in Dedham Vale and East Bergholt. (His Flatford Mill elms were U. minor.) Elm trees in Old Hall Park, East Bergholt, showing a clump of these hybrids, is often considered the finest of Constable's elm-studies.

Accessions

North America
 Arnold Arboretum, US. Acc. nos. 325-81, 7614, 92-38
 Bartlett Tree Experts, US. Acc. nos. 1245, 1246
 New York Botanical Garden, US. Acc. no. 508/79
 Niagara Parks Botanical Gardens, US. Acc. no. 940414

Europe
 Sir Harold Hillier Gardens, UK. Acc. no. 1977.0615
 Wijdemeren City Council, Netherlands. Elm collection. Frans Halslaan, Loosdrecht (~1960)

Australasia
 Eastwoodhill Arboretum , Gisborne, New Zealand. 24 trees, details not known.
 Waite Arboretum , University of Adelaide, Adelaide, Australia. Acc. nos. 368, 339

Nurseries

North America

None known.

Europe
 Boomwekerijen 'De Batterijen' , Netherlands.

Australasia
 Fleming's Nursery , Monbulk, Victoria, Australia

Notes

References

External links
  Labelled U. hollandica aff. vegeta, Magdalen College Grove specimen 1 (Heybroek, Oxford 1958)
  Labelled U. hollandica aff. vegeta, Magdalen College Grove specimen 2 (Heybroek, Oxford 1958)

Ulmus articles with images
hollandica
Ulmus hybrids
Taxa named by Philip Miller